Cynthia Helena Shepard Perry (née Norton; born 11 November 1928) is an American educator and diplomat.  She served as U.S. Ambassador to Sierra Leone and Burundi and as American Executive Director of the African Development Bank.  Throughout her career Perry promoted racial and gender equality, international cooperation, and African economic development.

Early life
Perry was born in 1928 in the mining town of Burnett, Indiana. She grew up in a segregated community called Lost Creek, Indiana, near Terre Haute, the sixth of nine children. She was one of the few blacks who graduated from Otter Creek High School in 1946. 
Perry credits her white high school principal with laying out for her what she needed to do to accomplish her dream of becoming an ambassador.

Cynthia married James Shepard, a mechanic, after graduating from high school.  She worked for a bank and for IBM, developing skills. The couple started a family.

Education
Cynthia Shepard won a scholarship to Indiana State University and completed a B.A. in political science from the university in 1968.

In 1968 she joined the University of Massachusetts' Center for International Education to study for a doctorate in education, which she completed in 1972. For her doctoral degree, Perry proposed to improve race relations by developing African Studies curricula for public schools. She had never been to Africa, so she recruited over 30 former Peace Corps volunteers who had served in Africa to develop and test African Studies curricula using their own first-hand experience and the latest research into black history and affective education.

Career 

Armed with a Doctorate in International Education, (Ed.D.) Cynthia Shepherd Perry moved between academe, consulting, and diplomacy depending upon which political party was in power. She honed her leadership skills in increasingly responsible positions, culminating in two challenging ambassadorships and an international development bank position under three Republican presidents.

Before starting doctoral work Perry already had secretarial, banking, and computer skills because of work she had done while attending school and raising her children. While working on her doctorate, she managed 34 returned Peace Corps volunteers and coordinated with the Public Schools of Worcester, Mass. She served as director of the National Teacher Corps at the University of Massachusetts Amherst. She also helped graduates of her program get jobs as teachers, and oversaw those who worked training teachers for The Federal Desegregation Center in Miami.

In 1969 Perry visited Africa for the first time when she accompanied students from Colby College to Ethiopia and Kenya on a summer secretarial training project. The trip was part of the Operation Crossroads Africa project at the University of Nairobi.

In 1973, Perry returned to Africa for three years with her second husband, Dr. J.O.Perry, who had taken a position with UNESCO at the University of Nairobi in Kenya. During his three-year tenure, she trained Peace Corps paramedical volunteers, lectured at the University, and served as a consultant to the United States Information Agency in Kenya, Nigeria, and Zambia. In 1974, She served as a member of diplomatic delegations to Sierra Leone, Ghana, Nigeria, and Liberia. In 1976, she was appointed to the staff of the United Nations Economic Commission for Africa in Addis Abba, Ethiopia.

Perry and her husband returned to Texas in 1978 and she was appointed dean of international affairs at Texas Southern University, a position she held until 1982.

In 1982, President Ronald Reagan appointed Perry chief of the Education and Human Resources Division in the Africa Bureau of the United States Agency for International Development. She was responsible for establishing policies and educational programs for the 43 Sub-Saharan nations receiving U.S. assistance at the time. In 1986, Pres. Reagan appointed Perry U.S. Ambassador to Sierra Leone; she held this position until 1990, when President George H.W. Bush appointed her U.S. Ambassador to Burundi. During this time Perry also served as Honorary Counsel General for Senegal.

In 1993, Perry returned to her position at Texas Southern University and in 1996 she moved to Texas Woman’s University as regent.

In 2001, President George W. Bush appointed her U.S. Executive Director of the African Development Bank in Abidjan, Ivory Coast and later, Tunis, Tunisia. She held this position until her retirement in 2007. Perry returned to Houston, where she continues to support education and development in Africa.

In 1998, Perry published her memoirs, All Things Being Equal: One Woman's Journey.

Recognition 
In 1987 NAACP presented Perry with its President's Award. In 1988, UMass awarded Perry an honorary doctorate of Public Service. In 2002 she received a Distinguished Alumni Award, and in 2014 a Salute to Service Award for outstanding contributions to public service.

Personal life

In November 1946, Perry married James Shepard, a mechanic.  When she was invited to join the postgraduate program in Massachusetts in 1968, her husband, hoping to keep her home, demanded a divorce. Her divorce from Shepard was finalized in 1971, and she married James Olden (J.O.) Perry; he died in 2006.

References

External sources

 Perry, Cynthia Shepard, interviewed by Crystal Mikel-Reynolds, Dr. Cynthia Shepard Perry: A Sycamore Destined for Greatness, Indiana State U., 2017; http://www.indstate.edu/sites/default/files/media/student-affairs/images/ambassador-cynthia-shepard-perry-essay.pdf
 Perry, Cynthia Shepard, interviewed by Charles Stuart Kennedy starting March 21, 1999, Interview with Cynthia S. Perry, Association for Diplomatic Studies and Training (ADST), Foreign Affairs Oral History Project, copyright 2000, FAOH, accessed March 9, 2019.

1928 births
Living people
Ambassadors of the United States to Burundi
Ambassadors of the United States to Sierra Leone
Indiana State University alumni
Texas Woman's University faculty
American women ambassadors
Texas Southern University faculty
University of Massachusetts Amherst people
American women academics
20th-century American diplomats
20th-century African-American women
20th-century African-American people
21st-century African-American women